Cabangus is a genus of gastropods belonging to the family Dendronotidae.

The species of this genus are found in Malesia.

Species:

Cabangus noahi 
Cabangus regius

References

Dendronotidae